The halte de Fontainebleau-Forêt is a railway halt in the Forest of Fontainebleau. The halt is located on the Paris–Marseille railway line.

This train stop is operated by the SNCF and the service is limited to a few Transilien trains in the mornings, on Saturdays, Sundays and public holidays.

The station is located halfway between Bois-Le-Roi and Fontainebleau – Avon stations, some 4 km away.

Passenger service 
The halt has no building or public markings, and its only platform is located on the Fontainebleau-bound direction (Track 1). The train conductor is responsible for the full operation and a mirror is located at the end of the platform to check for passengers.

The halt is mainly used by people hiking through the forest and boarding the train is not allowed.

There is no official signage and the stop is not marked on official train maps. It is sometimes indicated on train station screens as « Arrêt en forêt » (Forest stop), but this is not always the case.

As of 14 February 2022, the stop is serviced by 2 trains from the Transilien Line R, only Fontainebleau-bound, on Saturdays, Sundays and public holidays (trains leaving at 8:16 and 9:16 from Paris-Gare-de-Lyon).

References 

Railway stations in Seine-et-Marne
Fontainebleau
Railway stations in France opened in 1950